Gorica pri Oplotnici (in older sources Gorični Vrh) is a settlement on the western edge of Oplotnica in eastern Slovenia. The area is part of the traditional region of Styria. The entire Municipality of Oplotnica is included in the Drava Statistical Region.

References

External links
Gorica pri Oplotnici on Geopedia

Populated places in the Municipality of Oplotnica